E4500 may refer to:
 A type of a digital camera from the Nikon Coolpix series
 A type of a processor from the Intel Core 2 series